James Park (November 10, 1892 – December 17, 1970) was a Major League Baseball pitcher who played for the St. Louis Browns from  to . He also played football, basketball, and baseball at the University of Kentucky from 1911 to 1915, and coached basketball there in 1915–16 and baseball in 1922.
Park also served as the head football coach at Transylvania University from 1919 to 1921, and he was also a student–coach at Eastern Kentucky University in 1909.

After his playing and coaching days, Park enjoyed a long and successful career as a lawyer, a career that was interspersed with terms of public office and with service in various capacities in the Republican party. In 1944 he was the Republican candidate for the United States Senate against the incumbent Alben W. Barkley, and, although defeated, he reduced the Democratic majority in Kentucky from approximately 145,000 (in 1940) to about 80,000 in 1944.

Head coaching record

Football

References

External links
 

1892 births
1970 deaths
American football quarterbacks
Major League Baseball pitchers
St. Louis Browns players
Kentucky Wildcats baseball coaches
Kentucky Wildcats men's basketball coaches
Kentucky Wildcats baseball players
Kentucky Wildcats men's basketball players
Kentucky Wildcats football players
Eastern Kentucky Colonels football coaches
Transylvania Pioneers football coaches
Richmond Pioneers players
Columbus Senators players
Kansas City Blues (baseball) players
Lexington Colts players
Lexington Reds players
Oklahoma City Indians players
Omaha Rourkes players
Salt Lake City Bees players
People from Richmond, Kentucky
Baseball players from Kentucky
Players of American football from Kentucky